Eli Robinson (June 23, 1908 – December 24, 1972) was a jazz trombonist and arranger.

After working in Cincinnati in bands led by Speed Webb and Zack Whyte, as well as McKinney's Cotton Pickers, and making his first recordings in 1935 with Blanche Calloway.

In 1936, he moved to New York City, where he was a member of the Teddy Hill and Willie Bryant big bands and the Mills Blue Rhythm Band. Three years later he played with Roy Eldridge and joined the big band of Lucky Millinder. Beginning in 1941, he spent several years as a member of the Count Basie Orchestra. He returned to working with Millinder, then joined Buddy Tate  in 1954. Robinson never recorded as a leader.

Discography

As sideman
 1935: "Louisiana Liza" b/w "I Gotta Swing" - Blanche Calloway (Vocalion)
 1935: "You Ain't Livin' Right" b/w "Line a Jive" – Blanche Calloway & Her Band (Vocalion)
 1939: The Varsity Sessions, Vol. 1 – Roy Eldridge/Buster Bailey (Storyville)
 1944: "Empty Hearted" b/w "Tush" – Earl Warren & His Orchestra (Savoy)
 1944: "Circus in Rhythm" b/w "Tush" – Earl Warren & His Orchestra (Savoy)
 1945: "Harlem Nocturne" b/w "Midnight in the Barrelhouse" – Johnny Otis Big Band (Savoy)
 1958: Swinging Like Tate – Buddy Tate (Felsted, 2004)
 1959: Tate's Date – Buddy Tate (Prestige Swingville, 2003)
 1970: Unbroken – Buddy Tate Celebrity Club Orchestra (MPS)
 1993: The Master's Touch - Lester Young (recorded 1944)

References

20th-century births
1972 deaths
American jazz trombonists
Male trombonists
People from Greenville, Georgia
20th-century American musicians
20th-century trombonists
20th-century American male musicians
American male jazz musicians